261 (two hundred [and] sixty-one) is a natural number proceeded by the number 260 and followed by 262. It has the prime factorization 32·29.

Mathematical properties 

261 is nonagonal number, unique period in base 2, and the number of possible unfolded tesseract patterns.

References 

Integers